Thomas Morton may refer to:
 Thomas Morton (bishop) (1564–1659), Bishop of Durham and Chester in the 17th century
 Thomas Morton (playwright) (1764–1838), British playwright
 Thomas Morton (colonist) (c. 1579–1647), British lawyer & early colonist of Massachusetts
 Thomas Morton (journalist) (active 2014), American journalist
 Thomas Morton (shipwright) (1781–1832), inventor of the Patent slip
 Thomas Morton (surgeon) (1813–1849), English surgeon
 Thomas Corsan Morton (1859–1928), Scottish artist of the Glasgow School
 Thomas Lewis Morton (1846–1914), English-born farmer and politician in Manitoba, Canada
 Thomas Morton (priest) (1894-1968), catholic priest and writer
 Thomas Morton, British Member of Parliament for Gloucestershire
 Thomas Morton, British Member of Parliament for Bishop's Lynn
 Tom Morton (born 1955), Scottish journalist, author and BBC Radio Scotland broadcaster